Corinth railway station is a station in Corinth in the northern Peloponnese, Greece. It was opened on 27 September 2005, replacing an older station old station, near the harbour. It should not be confused with the now-closed station Corinth railway station, which is located northeast of the current station, closer to the coast of the Corinthian Gulf.

History
The new station lies on the Athens Airport–Patras railway and was opened as the line's western terminus on 27 September 2005. It remained so until 9 July 2007, when the line was extended to Kiato. The new station should not be confused with the old Corinth station on the Piraeus-Patras line of the former SPAP, which is located north of the current station (inside the city of Corinth), which closed in 2007. The station is served by Line 2 of the Athens Suburban Railway between Piraeus and Kiato. The two stations are still connected by a metric line, which is a small branch of the Corinth-Kalamata railway line and which operated to promote passengers between the Peloponnese and Attica between 2005 and 2007, how it is now disused. In 2009, with the Greek debt crisis unfolding OSE's Management was forced to reduce services across the network. Timetables were cutback and routes closed, as the government-run entity attempted to reduce overheads. In 2017 OSE's passenger transport sector was privatised as TrainOSE, currently a wholly-owned subsidiary of Ferrovie dello Stato Italiane infrastructure, including stations, remained under the control of OSE. In July 2022, the station began being served by Hellenic Train, the rebranded TranOSE.

Facilities
The raised station is assessed via stairs or a ramp. It has three island platform 1 side platform (however but only two platforms presently in use), with station buildings located on platform 1, with access to the platform level via stairs or lift from a subway. In the subway to the platforms, copies of ancient artefacts excavated during the station's construction are on display. The Station buildings are equipped with a booking office, toilets & a cafe located at the entrance to the station. At platform level, there are sheltered seating, an air-conditioned indoor passenger shelter and Dot-matrix display departure and arrival screens and timetable poster boards on both platforms. There is a large car park on-site, adjacent to the eastbound line. Currently, there is a local bus stop connecting the station, a large, free car park, and a taxi rank, all located at the station forecourt.

Services

Since 15 May 2022, the following weekday services call at this station:

Station layout

Future
The reopening of the metric line from Loutraki to Nafplio sections is currently being examined, especially for the tourist needs of the area. The new Italian management of TRAINOSE has expressed its interest in the operation of the department.

References

External links
 Corinth railway station - National Railway Network Greek Travel Pages

Buildings and structures in Corinthia
Corinth
Railway stations in Corinthia
Railway stations opened in 2005